Charles Yang may refer to:
 Charles Yang (violinist)
 Charles Yang (linguist)